Gossner Evangelical Lutheran Church in Chotanagpur and Assam (GELC) is a major Christian Protestant denomination in India. It has hundreds of thousands of members. It was established on 2 November 1845. It belongs to National Council of Churches in India, United Evangelical Lutheran Church in India, Lutheran World Federation and World Council of Churches.
It is led by Moderator Bishop Johann Dang. It is one of the three Lutheran denominations in northeast India along with the Bodo Evangelical Lutheran Church and the Northern Evangelical Lutheran Church.

History
The Gossner Evangelical Lutheran Church with its headquarters located in Ranchi, Jharkhand (formerly Bihar) is one of the largest and widespread Lutheran Churches in India. Its past can be traced back to 1845 when Johannes Evangelista Gossner (Germany) sent four missionaries namely:
Rev. Emil Satz,
Rev. August Brandt,
Rev. Fredrick Basch and
Rev. Theodore Yankey
for launching the 'Lutheran mission' in India.

The missionaries left Germany in 1844 and reached Kolkata (formerly Calcutta) in 1845. They were initially heading for Mergui in Myanmar (formerly Burma) in view of preaching the Christian faith among the Karen people or in the areas located in the footsteps of the Himalayas. However, on meeting some people from Ranchi, they changed their plan and headed for Chhotanagpur and its main town, Ranchi.
They reached Ranchi on 2 November 1845 and camped on, what is now known as, the 'Bethesda Ground' in Ranchi.

First Baptisms
The first baptism was performed on 25 June 1846 when a girl named 'Martha' received the sacrament. More children were baptized on 26 June 1846.

Adult Conversion:
Four Oraon  on 9 June 1850
Munda on 26 October 1851,
Nine Bengali  on 1 October 1855,
Two Kharia  on 8 June 1866 and
One Ho  on 10 May 1868 were baptized.

The Rev. Johannes Evangelista Gossner sent money equivalent to ₹13000 from his personal funds to the missionaries, so that they can build a church in Ranchi. It was named as Christ Church. The church still stands and is used regularly.

Protests

During the Indian Rebellion of 1857, in the month of July, the church faced widespread protests against it. The students and other Christians of the area had to flee and take refuge in the jungles of 'Dumargari, Bilsereng' which is 38 km from Ranchi. They erected a Stone Cross there to mark the place. The place is now known as 'Khristan Dera' and a service is held at the same place every year on 1 February. It was during those days when  cannonballs were fired by the Mutineers of the British Army stationed there, at the church building in Ranchi. It caused no damage other than blowing-off the top of the building and can still be seen stuck on one of the walls.

During the World War I the missionaries were forced to return to Germany in 1915 and the control of the church was handed over to the Rev. Foss Westcott, the then Anglican Bishop, who also happens to be the founder of Bishop Westcott Boys' School.

Autonomy and Administration
The church declared its autonomy on 10 July 1919. The body formed to take care of the Church and the sub organizations was called 'Central Church Council'. The Government formed a body called 'Mission Trust of Northern India' to govern and to take care of the church's property. This trust was dissolved on 1928. The trust agreed and handed over all of the church's property to be managed by the 'Board of trustees' until 1938. The Board then transferred all of it back to the Church on 9 May 1940.

The church was duly registered on 30 July 1921 in the office of the Registrar, Joint stock Company, Patna, under the 'societies Registration Act 21 of 1860 (Vide No-273J)'.

The Church was then headed by The President of the Church. The first president of the church was Rt.Rev. Hanukdatto Lakra, while the position of the first Secretary was held by Mr. Peter Hurad. The advisory board was dissolved on 10 February 1928. Many of the German Missionaries came back to India in the same year and started working under the Church.

They were put on house arrest starting 1939 when the Second World War started.

The rules were amended in 1948 and the whole area was divided into 15 Synods. The Congregation in Ranchi was selected as the Headquarters. The rules were amended again in 1960 and the church was divided into 4 Anchals (Units of Districts of the Church) and a Synod Khuntitoli along with the headquarters being the Ranchi Congregation. Khuntitoli was declared as the fifth Diocese in 1970.
A Central Advisory Board, 5 Anchals and several other boards were also formed to assist the Central Advisory Board (K.S.S).

The Central Advisory Board decided to amend the rules once again in 1973, the amendments were to come into force from 1975, but due to several reasons the amendments could not. The K.S.S. was formed again but only by the four Anchals of the Church which was unconstitutionally. As a result, the North West Anchal conducted its election on the basis of the 1960s constitution and formed the North Western Gossner Evangelical Lutheran Church. Later on two priests of the North Western Gossner Evangelical Lutheran Church joined the Gossner Evangelical Lutheran Church and became the North West Ancal. Efforts for a compromise were put in by the United Evangelical Lutheran Church in India for many years, but all of them failed.

Another effort to make amendments to the rules was made, but even this one failed. The amendments finally came into effect 2 November 1995. According to these amendments, the church has been divided into the Ranchi Headquarters Congregation and 5 Dioceses:
North East Diocese (Assam, Tejpur)
North West Diocese (Ranchi and North Western areas)
South East Diocese (South East of Ranchi, Kadma, Khunti)
South West Diocese (South West of Ranchi, Orrissa, Rajgangpur)
Central Diocese (Khuntitoli, Simdega) - The central council included Jatatoli and Kinirkela Parish from the North West Diocese and the Kornjo Parish from the South East Diocese to the Central Diocese in the meeting held during 16–18 May 2006. This was formally announced on 17 January 2007.

Present day Operations

The church has five dioceses headed by the Moderator. Ranchi is the headquarters and the Dean heads its congregation. At present it has around 5,00,000 congregational members spread over 1687 pastorates (Congregation-wise) in the state of Jharkhand, Bihar, West Bengal, Madhya Pradesh, Chhattisgarh, Orissa, Maharashtra, Arunachal Pradesh, Assam, Haryana, Andaman and Nicobar, Uttar Pradesh  and the major cities like Delhi, Kolkata, Chennai, Mumbai etc. It has its presence in the northeastern states as well.

It runs the following institution -
A Gossner Theological College,
A Bible School,
Four Colleges,
Two Teachers' Training Colleges,
A Technical Centre,
An Agricultural Training Centre,
A Human Resources Development Centre,
Twenty four Secondary schools,
A Printing Press cum Training Centre,
A Hospital,
A Dispensary,
Three Boarding Homes for poor and needy and
An Old Age Home.

Its overseas Mission partners are Gossner Mission (Berlin, Germany) and the Evangelical Church Berlin-Brandenburg-schlesische Oberlausitz Germany.

GELC is a member church of the United Evangelical Lutheran Church in India. The other members are:

Andhra Evangelical Lutheran Church
Arcot Lutheran Church
Evangelical Lutheran Church in Madhya Pradesh
Evangelical Lutheran Church in the Himalayan States
Good Samaritan Evangelical Lutheran Church
Indian Evangelical Lutheran Church
Jeypore Evangelical Lutheran Church
Northern Evangelical Lutheran Church
South Andhra Lutheran Church
Tamil Evangelical Lutheran Church

Women and Youth involvement
The Women and youth in the church also play a vital role in conducting relief and awareness programmes, specially to be mentioned are their role during Bhopal gas tragedy and the cyclone in Orissa.

See also
North Western Gossner Evangelical Lutheran Church
Gossner Theological College
Adivasi
Christianity in India
Christianity in Jharkhand

References

External links
Gossner Mission (founder and partner of the GELC, German)
United Evangelical Lutheran Church in India

Lutheran World Federation members
Lutheranism in India
Lutheran denominations established in the 20th century
Christian organizations established in 1919
1919 establishments in British India
Affiliated institutions of the National Council of Churches in India